Salut les copains, full title Salut les copains: Le Spectacle Musicale is a 2012 French musical comedy written by Pascal Forneri and directed and choreographed by Stéphane Jarny based on the yé-yé generation of music of the period exemplified by the French renowned radio program Salut les copains and the ensuing music magazine of the same title.

Synopsis
In the 1960s, French youth are infatuated with the new yéyé trend of music. Catherine and Michel are in love with each other and what joins them is their love for Idole. The couple live their love affair through music stretching nearly a decade and considered the definitive period of French new pop culture.

Cast
 as The "Idole"
Replaced by Nuno Resende in same role
Fanny Fourquez as Catherine
Flo Malley as Michel
Anaïs Delva as Annie
Replaced by Aurore Delplace in same role
Gregory Deck as Jacques
Marie Facundo as Nicole
Alexandre Faitrouni as Pierre
Laurent Paolini as Roger

Anaïs Delva in the role of Annie had to leave the French tour after the Lille shows, having been engaged in another musical called Les amants d'un jour where she took the role of Marilou. She was replaced by Aurore Delplace, an earlier candidate on the French reality television series The Voice, la plus belle voix in Team Louis Bertignac.

Songs
 "Poupée de cire, poupée de son"
 "Retiens la nuit" (Michel)
 "Itsi bitsy"
 "Laisse tomber les filles"
 Jingle Salut les copains
 "Je vends des robes"
 "La plus belle pour aller danser"
 "Love Me, Please Love Me"
 "Mes parents n'aimaient que le classique"
 "(I Can't Get No) Satisfaction"
 "Les mauvais garcons"
 "Yesterday"
 "Il est mort le soleil"
 "Slc salut les copains"
 "Vous les copains"
 "Tous les garçons et les filles"
 "Le telefon"
 "My Generation"

Personnel
Stéphane Jarny - Mise en scène and Choreography
Patricia Delon - Assistant mise en scène / Technical and artistic coordination
Mehdi Kerkouch - Collaboration in choreography
Pascal Forneri - Writer
Agnès Boury - Dialogues and direction of actors
Stéphane Laporte - Dialogues
Nathalie Dupuy - Vocal coach
Bruno Berberes - Casting
Arnaud Ducret - Casting Comedy
Vincent Heden - Vocal arrangements
Chiquito - Musical artistic direction - Executive production
David Berland - Musical direction and orchestrations
Stéfanie Jarre - Decor - scenography
Joséphine Gad - Assistant decor and scenography
Elodie Chailloux  - graphic conception
Gwen Vinson – KI Studio - video
Ateliers Jipanco - Construction of decor
Gaumont Pathé Archives - Images from May 1968 
Ina - Image archives from ORTF (author: Christian Hourriez)
Tommy Pascal - Montage of archive images
vanessa Coquet - Costumes
Cécilia Sebaoun - Costumes 
Régis Vigneron - Lighting
Philippe Parmentier - Sound
Antoine Wauquier - Hairstyle
Aurellie Yvon - Assistant hairstyle
Jocelyne Lemery - Make-up

References

External links
Official website

2012 musicals
French musicals